William Louis "Colonel Bill" Hayward (July 2, 1868 – December 14, 1947) was a track and field coach at the University of Oregon  and a track coach for six United States Olympic teams, from 1908 through 1932.

Athletic career
Hayward was born in Detroit, Michigan. His parents were Canadians and he grew up in Toronto, Ontario, Canada. An all-around athlete likened to Jim Thorpe, Hayward excelled at ice hockey, rowing, wrestling, boxing, and played lacrosse on one of the Ottawa Capitals' world championship teams of the 1890s. Hayward was also renowned as one of Canada's fastest sprinters, running distances from 75 to 600 yards. His last name was originally spelled Heyward; he changed it later in life, when he headed west.

Early coaching career
Hayward's first coaching job was as an assistant track coach, first at Princeton University in New Jersey in 1898, and then out west at the University of California in Berkeley. In 1901, he moved north to Oregon, becoming the head track coach at Pacific University in Forest Grove, where he trained future Olympic gold medalist A. C. Gilbert and coached the Boxers to the state collegiate track championship.

In 1903, Hayward took the head job at Albany College (now Lewis & Clark College in Portland), where his track team defeated the University of Oregon. Oregon promptly hired him as their first permanent track coach the next year.

Oregon and Olympic career

As head coach of the UO track and field team, Hayward (who was known as "Colonel Bill" due to his gruff demeanor) built it into one of regional dominance and national prominence over his 44 years as coach. In all, he coached four track world record holders, six American record holders, and nine Olympians. Notable Oregon athletes trained by Hayward include:

 sprinter Daniel Kelly set records in the 100-yard dash at 9.6 seconds in 1906 and the 220 yard run (21.1 sec.), won silver medal in the long jump at the 1908 Olympics
 hurdler Martin Hawkins won a bronze medal in the 110 meter hurdles at the 1912 Olympics
 pole vaulter Ralph Spearow set the world record in 1924
 long distance runner Ralph Hill won a silver medal in the 5000 meters at the 1932 Olympics
 discus thrower Ed Moeller set the world record in 1929
 javelin thrower Bob Parke, 1934 NCAA champion
 sprinter Mack Robinson, 1938 NCAA champion in the 220 yard dash, won a silver medal in the 200 meters at the 1936 Olympics
 pole vaulter George Varoff set the world record in 1936
 high jumper Les Steers set three world records and was 1941 NCAA champion.
 Bill Bowerman succeeded Hayward as coach and co-founded Nike, Inc. with Phil Knight.

In addition to his track coaching duties, Hayward served as the athletic trainer for Oregon's football team, where he was known for inventing knee braces and other equipment for the players. He also coached UO's basketball team from 1903 to 1913 and again in 1917–1918, compiling an overall record o 

In 1912, Hayward was a coach for the United States team at the Olympic Games in Stockholm, Sweden, the first of a string of six Olympics in which he coached, through 1936.

Hayward Field
Prior to 1921, Hayward's athletes trained at Kincaid Field, which was also the site of Oregon's football field. The field was upgraded several times to accommodate the needs of the growing track and field program, but by 1912, plans for a new facility were made. In 1919, a new football field was built and named Hayward Field in his honor; it was dedicated during halftime of its first football game, but Hayward was busy working as the trainer during the break and was not aware of the honor until the next day. It was two more years before track and field facilities were installed at the new venue. The opening of Autzen Stadium for football in 1967 gave the track and field team exclusive use of Hayward Field, except for a few freshman football games.

Death and legacy
 Hayward retired from coaching at age 79 in the fall of 1947. He was hospitalized a few months later after being stricken with a heart ailment, and died at Sacred Heart Hospital on December 14, 1947. Hayward was buried at Rest-Haven Cemetery in Eugene.

John Warren succeeded Hayward for the 1947–48 school year, giving way to Bill Bowerman, who became Oregon's head track coach in 1948.

Hayward was an inaugural inductee to both the Oregon Sports Hall of Fame in 1980 and the University of Oregon Athletic Hall of Fame in 1992. In 2005, he was inducted into the U.S. Track & Field and Cross Country Coaches Association Hall of Fame. The Bill Hayward Amateur Athlete of Year Award is given annually to the best amateur athlete in the state of Oregon.

References

External links

University of Oregon – Bill Hayward
University of Oregon Athletics Hall of Fame – Bill Hayward
Oregon Sports Hall of Fame and Museum – Bill Hayward

1868 births
1947 deaths
American track and field coaches
Canadian lacrosse players
California Golden Bears track and field coaches
Lewis & Clark Pioneers coaches
Oregon Ducks men's basketball coaches
Oregon Ducks track and field coaches
Pacific Tigers track and field coaches
Princeton Tigers track and field coaches
Sportspeople from Detroit
Athletes from Toronto
Basketball coaches from Michigan
American emigrants to Canada